Madigan Men is an American sitcom that premiered on ABC on October 6, 2000. The show was put on hiatus in December 2000 in the midst of cast and crew changes, and was later cancelled after one season.

Cast
Gabriel Byrne as Ben Madigan
Roy Dotrice as Seamus Madigan
John Hensley as Luke Madigan
Grant Shaud as Alex Rosetti
Sabrina Lloyd as Wendy Lipton

Wendy Lipton, the secretary, was played by Clea Lewis in the pilot, but was replaced by Sabrina Lloyd after that.

Episodes

References

External links

2000s American sitcoms
2000 American television series debuts
2000 American television series endings
American Broadcasting Company original programming
English-language television shows
Television series by ABC Studios
Television shows set in New York City